Robin David Mann (born 31 October 1973) is an English former first-class cricketer.

Mann was born at Middlesbrough in October 1973 and later studied at the University of Cambridge. While studying at Cambridge, he played first-class cricket for Cambridge University Cricket Club in 1994, making nine appearances. Playing as an opening and middle order batsman in the Cambridge side, he scored 248 runs at an average of 15.50; he made one score of over fifty, making 53 runs against Worcestershire.

References

External links

1973 births
Living people
Cricketers from Middlesbrough
Alumni of the University of Cambridge
English cricketers
Cambridge University cricketers